Hilario Bernardo Navarro Ruiz (born 14 November 1980) is an Argentine professional footballer who plays as a goalkeeper for Resistencia in Paraguay.

Career

Navarro started in the youth divisions of Huracán Corrientes. In 2001, he was signed by Paraguayan side Club Guaraní, staying at the team until 2005. Subsequently, in 2006, Navarro joined Cerro Porteño, also of Paraguay. One year later, he returned to Argentina to join Racing Club, in the first division. He established himself as the club's first choice goalkeeper after Gustavo Campagnuolo suffered a one-game suspension and a subsequent injury.

On August 7, 2008, Navarro signed with Independiente, Racing's biggest rivals. On March 11, 2009, San Lorenzo negotiated a loan agreement with Independiente for 4 months of Navarro's services as their primary goalkeeper, to stand in for the injured Agustín Orión.

In March 2019, Navarro joined Resistencia in Paraguay.

Honours
Independiente
Copa Sudamericana (1): 2010

References

External links
 Argentine Primera statistics at Fútbol XXI  
 Football-Lineups player profile
 

1980 births
Living people
People from Corrientes
Argentine footballers
Argentine expatriate footballers
Argentine sportspeople of Paraguayan descent
Association football goalkeepers
Club Guaraní players
Cerro Porteño players
Paraguayan Primera División players
Primera Nacional players
Argentine Primera División players
Racing Club de Avellaneda footballers
Club Atlético Independiente footballers
San Lorenzo de Almagro footballers
Estudiantes de La Plata footballers
Club Atlético Banfield footballers
Boca Unidos footballers
Resistencia S.C. footballers
Expatriate footballers in Paraguay
Argentine expatriate sportspeople in Paraguay
Sportspeople from Corrientes Province